Highway 60 or ("Kvish Shishim") is a south–north intercity road in Israel and the West Bank that stretches from Beersheba to Nazareth.

Route and specifics
The Highway is in large parts following the same general route as the so-called biblical "Way of the Patriarchs", since it also follows the central watershed of the hill country, which figures prominently in the travels of the Biblical patriarchs.

From its junction with Highway 40 in Beersheba to the city's outskirts, Route 60 is a dual carriageway with at-grade intersections. While it continues on to serve as the main north–south artery between Israeli settlements and Palestinian communities such as the cities of Hebron and Bethlehem in the southern West Bank, it is a two-lane, shoulderless road until past Hebron at Gush Etzion Junction, where it regains its lane-separation until short of Bethlehem, that section having recently been widened. Upon entering Jerusalem, its lanes are again mostly separated as it serves as a central artery in the city center. In the northern quarters it becomes a separate grade freeway with multiple interchanges, from where it continues through the central and northern West Bank as a two-lane road, not being divided again until the stretch between Afula and its terminus in downtown Nazareth.

Due to it running through a mainly rural setting, many of the junctions along its route feature hitchhiking posts called trempiadas.

Access, bypass roads
At present, the highway is non-contiguous pending final status agreement between Israel and the Palestinians. The section through Jenin is closed to yellow (Israeli) license plates. The sections north and south of the West Bank and through Jerusalem are closed to green (Palestinian Authority) license plates.

Before the Oslo Accords, Palestinians lived under Israeli authority and could travel freely on the road. After the Palestinian Authority assumed control over various cities, Israel established checkpoints on areas of the route which entered Palestinian jurisdiction. New routes of highway were paved so that Israeli traffic could bypass the Palestinian towns in order to reduce friction. These so-called bypass roads, while a contentious issue in their own right due to the varying levels of limitation on Palestinian access, also served as an improvement to the road which allowed traffic to flow around, rather than through the heart of congested urban areas.

Tunnels Highway
One of the more sophisticated segments – built on lands east of the Green line set in 1967 – is the stretch known as the Tunnels Highway. Designed by a French firm , the route leads from southern Jerusalem to the Jewish settlements area of Gush Etzion, bypasses Bethlehem and then heading to the northwest using a pair of tunnels; the northern tunnel, called the Gilo tunnel because it is adjacent to the Gilo neighborhood/Settlement, is 270 metres long. The second tunnel, called the Refaim tunnel based on the nearby Refaim Valley and passing under Har Gilo and Beit Jala, is 900 m long, making it the longest road tunnel in the West Bank. The tunnels are linked by the West Bank's highest and longest bridge, crossing the Walaja Valley.

In Jerusalem
Within Jerusalem, Highway 60, known by the municipality as the Talpiot–Atarot Axis and often referred to by its official Jerusalem Municipality designation, "Road 1" (not to be confused with National Highway 1), is the central north–south artery running through the city centre. The Jerusalem portion of the road begins at the Tunnels Road (the northern end of the Bethlehem Bypass), passes the edges of Gilo and Beit Safafa, joins the "Hebron Road" from Bethlehem and continues northward through Talpiot. This section is divided with multiple lanes and has undergone recent construction to include dedicated bus lanes and infrastructure for its eventual conversion into a line of the Jerusalem Light Rail.

At its junction with David Remez Street, in the Abu Tor neighborhood, Route 60 narrows and descends into the Hinnom Valley, curving around Sultan's Pool directly under Mount Zion. It then ascends as Hativat Yerushalayim Street to intersect with the Jaffa Gate entrance to the Old City of Jerusalem.

From there it runs underneath the Jaffa Gate Square, briefly overlaps Jaffa Road and then enters "HaTsanhanim Tunnel" passing underneath Jerusalem's New Gate. It emerges just west of the Damascus Gate intersecting with Street of the Prophets, again becoming a divided street. This section of the road includes tracks for the now completed Jerusalem Light Rail's red line.

Briefly called Heil HaHandassa Boulevard and then Haim Bar-Lev Boulevard, it continues northward passing Meah Shearim, the American Colony, and French Hill, until Meinertzhagen junction, where it becomes a separate grade freeway. As a freeway, it interchanges with Highway 1 at Sha'ar Mizrah. The freeway then bypasses Shuafat with one of the longest and highest bridges in the country, feeding into Beit Hanina and Pisgat Ze'ev with two more interchanges. It continues as an at-grade road intersecting with Neve Yaakov Blvd. and finally exits the city near Kalandia.

Israeli-Palestinian conflict
Route 60 was a central scene of violence during the al-Aqsa Intifada, which was in part defined by the thousands of shooting attacks on its Israeli traffic, including hundreds of casualties.  The Israeli Army, in response, has fortified various sections with anti-sniper walls and had established checkpoints along the route. The Tunnels Highway came under particularly heavy assault during the shooting on Gilo neighborhood since it lies between Gilo and Beit Jala. The concrete barriers employed on other dangerous stretches of road were too heavy to be supported by the bridge, and so a barrier of bulletproof composite armour similar to that employed on Merkava tanks was constructed.

The road was also the site of terrorist attacks in June, August 2010, and June 2015.

Junctions and interchanges

See also
List of highways in Israel
Nablus Road, old road, now city street, once connecting Jerusalem's Old City (Damascus Gate) to Nablus
Way of the Patriarchs, the main north–south historical route in the area

References & Notes

Further reading

Roads in Israel
Limited-access roads in Israel
Roads in Israeli-occupied territories
Streets in Jerusalem